Benito Gennaro Franceschetti (June 14, 1935 – February 4, 2005) was a Roman Catholic archbishop.

Ordained to the priesthood in 1960, Franceschetti was appointed archbishop of the Roman Catholic Archdiocese of Fermo, Italy, in 1997. He died while still in office.

Notes

1935 births
2005 deaths
Archbishops of Fermo
20th-century Italian Roman Catholic archbishops